Black Daisy was an Irish-Lithuanian band that, along with Sinéad Mulvey represented Ireland at the Eurovision Song Contest 2009 with the song Et Cetera.

Biography 
The band originated from Dublin, and was formed by Steff Caffrey (lead guitar and backing vocals), Nicole Billings (rhythm guitar and backing vocals), Asta Millerienė (drums), and Lesley-Ann Halvey (lead vocals and bass guitar). Steff Caffrey was asked to leave the band in February 2009 as RTÉ, the Irish national Broadcaster, felt that a 4 piece backing band was too large for the Eurovision stage.

Eurovision 2009 
On the 20 February 2009, the band, performing with Irish singer Sinéad Mulvey, won the Irish pre-selection for the Eurovision Song Contest 2009 in Moscow, Russia. They competed in the second semi-final on 14 May 2009, failing to reach the final.

Videos

References

External links 
 RTÉ Eurovision website

Eurovision Song Contest entrants for Ireland
Eurovision Song Contest entrants of 2009
You're a Star contestants
All-female bands